No Need to Reason is the third album of Icelandic post-black metal band Kontinuum. It was released on 6 July 2018 through Season Of Mist.

Tracklist

References

2018 albums